The Olympic Equestrian Centre, Bromont is a horse sports venue located in Bromont, Quebec. Built in 1975, it hosted the equestrian (except for team jumping which was held at Olympic Stadium in Montreal) and the riding portion of the modern pentathlon competitions for the 1976 Summer Olympics.

Since the 1976 Games, the venue has hosted numerous equestrian events.

References
1976 Summer Olympics official report. Volume 2. pp. 194–201.
1976 Summer Olympics official report. Volume 3. pp. 520–2, 550–60.
JC Championships at Bromont in 2003. - accessed 31 August 2010.

External links 
Official site

Venues of the 1976 Summer Olympics
Equestrian venues in Quebec
Olympic equestrian venues
Olympic modern pentathlon venues
Sports venues in Quebec
Buildings and structures in Montérégie
Sports venues completed in 1975
Brome-Missisquoi Regional County Municipality